Ilex urbaniana, known commonly as the Urban's holly, is a species of tree or shrub in the Aquifoliaceae or holly family of flowering plants. It is found on Hispaniola, Puerto Rico, and the U.S. and British Virgin Islands.

References

urbaniana
Flora of Haiti
Flora of the Dominican Republic
Flora of Puerto Rico
Flora of the British Virgin Islands
Flora of the United States Virgin Islands